The European Journal of Preventive Cardiology is a peer-reviewed medical journal that covers research on the cardiovascular system. The journal's editor-in-chief is Massimo Francesco Piepoli (Cardiac Unit, Guglielmo da Saliceto Hospital, Piacenza, Italy). It was established in 1994 as the European Journal of Cardiovascular Prevention & Rehabilitation and obtained its current title in 2012. It is currently published by SAGE Publications on behalf of the European Society of Cardiology.

Abstracting and indexing 
The European Journal of Preventive Cardiology is the Official Journal of the European Association for Preventive Cardiology of the European Society of Cardiology, dedicated to primary and secondary cardiovascular prevention and sports cardiology.
It publishes 18 issues yearly and abstracted and indexed in Scopus and the Social Sciences Citation Index. According to the Journal Citation Reports, its 2016 impact factor is 5.640, ranking it 22nd out of 136 journals in the category "Cardiac & Cardiovascular Systems".
Areas of interests are Cardiovascular primary and secondary preventions, (including arterial hypertension, dyslipidaemia, diabetes, obesity, smoking cessation, healthy life style promotion), epidemiology, cardiac rehabilitation, exercise training and physiology, sport cardiology, population science intervention.

References

External links 
 

SAGE Publishing academic journals
English-language journals
Cardiology journals
Bimonthly journals
Publications established in 1994
Academic journals associated with international learned and professional societies of Europe